391st may refer to:

391st Bombardment Group, non-flying unit of the Pennsylvania Air National Guard, stationed at Horsham Air National Guard Station
391st Bombardment Squadron, part of the 6th Air Mobility Wing at MacDill Air Force Base, Florida
391st Fighter Squadron (391 FS), part of the 366th Fighter Wing at Mountain Home Air Force Base, Idaho

See also
391 (number)
391, the year 391 (CCCXCI) of the Julian calendar
391 BC